Xerocrassa molinae is a species of air-breathing land snail, a pulmonate gastropod mollusk in the family Geomitridae.

Distribution

This species is endemic to Spain, where it is restricted to the islands of Columbrete Grande (Illa Grossa) and Mancolibre (Columbretes Islands group).

References

 Bank, R. A.; Neubert, E. (2017). Checklist of the land and freshwater Gastropoda of Europe. Last update: July 16th, 2017

External links

 Hidalgo, J. G. (1883). Description de deux espèces nouvelles d'Helix. Journal de Conchyliologie. 31: 56-58, pl. 2. Paris

molinae
Molluscs of Europe
Endemic fauna of Spain
Gastropods described in 1883